Kolpinsky District  is an administrative and municipal district (raion), one of the 18 in Saint Petersburg, Russia.

See also
Administrative divisions of Saint Petersburg

 
Districts of Saint Petersburg